One More Song is the second solo studio album by former Eagles bassist Randy Meisner. Released in October 1980 by Epic Records in the United States, and in the United Kingdom. The album is to date Meisner's most successful album as a solo artist, peaking at number 50, on the US Billboard 200 chart.

The single, "Deep Inside My Heart" featuring Kim Carnes, peaked at number 22 on the US Billboard Hot 100, and the single "Hearts on Fire" peaked at number 19, three months later.

Critical reception
Retrospectively reviewing for AllMusic, critic Mike DeGagne wrote of the album "One More Song highlights Meisner's knack for writing honest, heartfelt love songs with a countrified rock candor that reveals his rustic, down-home roots." and he added that, "One More Song ends up being a pleasurable set of modest songs from a musician who was glad to be home."

Track listing
Side one
"Hearts on Fire" (Eric Kaz, Meisner) – 2:48
"Gotta Get Away" (Kaz, Meisner, Wendy Waldman) – 4:03
"Come on Back to Me" (Kaz, Meisner, Waldman) – 3:51
"Deep Inside My Heart" duet with Kim Carnes (Kaz, Meisner) – 3:29
"I Need You Bad" (Kaz, Meisner, Waldman) – 3:11

Side two
"One More Song" (Jack Tempchin) – 3:55
"Trouble Ahead" (Kaz, Meisner, Waldman) – 4:12
"White Shoes" (Tempchin) – 4:11
"Anyway Bye Bye" (Richie Furay) – 4:30

Personnel
 Randy Meisner – lead vocals, guitar
 Craig Hull – guitar, pedal steel, steel guitar
 Bryan Garofalo – bass
 Sterling Smith – keyboards
 Craig Krampf – drums
 Don Francisco (not to be confused with the Christian singer of the same name) – percussion, vocals, background vocals

with:
 Kim Carnes – backing vocals on "Deep Inside My Heart"
 Bill Cuomo – synthesizer on "I Need You Bad" and "One More Song"
 Glenn Frey – backing vocals on "One More Song"
 Don Henley – backing vocals on "One More Song"
 Michael Jacobson – saxophone on "I Need You Bad"
 Wendy Waldman – acoustic guitar, guitar, backing vocals on "Come on Back to Me"

Production
Producer: Val Garay
Engineer: Val Garay
Assistant engineer: Niko Bolas, James Ledner
Mastering: Mike Reese, Doug Sax
Photography: Aaron Rapoport

Charts

Singles
Billboard (North America)

References

External links

Randy Meisner albums
1980 albums
Albums produced by Val Garay
Epic Records albums